is the third maxi single by Japanese nu metal band Maximum the Hormone, released on September 3, 2003

Track listing
 "Rolling 1000toon" - 2:46
 "Koi no Sweet Kuso Meriken" (恋のスウィート糞メリケン Sweet Yankee faeces of love)- 3:43
 "Forever Hey! Ho! Let's Go! (Ramones Tribute)" (フォーエバーHEY!HO!LET'S GO! ～ラモーンズに捧ぐ～) - 2:47
 "Abara Bob (BAMBOOMAN Mix #2)" (アバラ・ボブ (BAMBOOMAN Mix#2)) - 4:17 (Secret track starting at 4:09)

2003 singles
Maximum the Hormone songs